Samantha Banfield (born 17 February 2004) is an footballer who plays as a central midfielder or a central attacking midfielder for League1 Ontario team Woodbridge Strikers B. Born in Canada, she represents the Guyana women's national team.

Club career
Banfield is a Pickering Soccer Club product. She has played for Woodbridge Strikers B in Canada.

International career
Banfield represented Guyana at the 2020 CONCACAF Women's U-20 Championship. She made her senior debut on 20 October 2021 in a 6–1 friendly away loss to Puerto Rico.

See also
List of Guyana women's international footballers

References

External links

2004 births
Living people
Citizens of Guyana through descent
Guyanese women's footballers
Women's association football midfielders
Guyana women's international footballers
Soccer people from Ontario
Canadian women's soccer players
Woodbridge Strikers (women) players
League1 Ontario (women) players
Canadian sportspeople of Guyanese descent
Pickering FC (women) players